International University of Malaya-Wales (IUMW) is an international joint university based in Kuala Lumpur, Malaysia.  It was founded in 2012 as a partnership between the University of Malaya (UM) and the University of Wales Trinity Saint David (UWTSD).  

IUMW offers both undergraduate and postgraduate programmes of study, and solicits both Malayan and international students. IUMW students are able to opt for dual programs of study whereby graduates of such dual programmes receive a degree from both the IUMW (in Malaysia) and the University of Wales Trinity Saint David (UWTSD) (in the UK); in other words, they graduate with two degrees.  IUMW students can also participate in a student exchange programme which gives them the opportunity to study at UWTSD.  IUMW students also have access to University of Malaya facilities and resources at no cost, which are also in Kuala Lumpur.

The IUMW campus is located on land leased from Bank Negara Malaysia that BNM acquired in 2017.

Academic Faculties and Centres
There are 3 academics faculties and centers under the International University of Malaya-Wales:
 Faculty of Business
 Faculty of Arts and Science
 Centre of Foundation, Language and Malaysian Studies

Academic Programmes
The Faculty of Business offers bachelor's degrees in entrepreneurship, human resource management, international business, Islamic finance, marketing, accounting, and real estate management and auction; a master of business administration degree; a doctor of business administration programme; and a doctor of philosophy degree in business.

The Faculty of Arts and Science offers bachelor's degrees in biotechnology, psychology, computer science, information technology, and professional communication; master's degrees in internet engineering, professional communication; and doctor of philosophy degrees in computer science, and professional communication.

The Centre of Foundation, Language and Malaysian Studies offers a foundation in science and a foundation in arts programmes.

IUMW’s Dual Award programmes are bachelor's degrees in computer science, professional communication, psychology entrepreneurship, human resource management, international business, Islamic finance, marketing, and accounting; and master of business administration degree. When students graduate, they will receive certification from both IUMW and UWTSD.

References

External links
 International University of Malaya-Wales
 University of Malaya
 University of Wales

Educational institutions established in 2012
2012 establishments in Malaysia
Universities and colleges in Kuala Lumpur
Business schools in Malaysia
Malaysia–United Kingdom relations
Private universities and colleges in Malaysia